The Swing's to TV (subtitled Bud Shank and Bob Cooper Play Theme Songs from Television Shows) is an album by saxophonists Bud Shank and Bob Cooper released on the World Pacific label. The album features jazz interpretations of theme music from the TV shows Disneyland, The Frank Sinatra Show, The Bob Hope Show, The Rosemary Clooney Show, The Danny Thomas Show, The Dinah Shore Show, The Eddie Fisher Show, The Bob Cummings Show, The Steve Allen Show and The George Burns and Gracie Allen Show.

Reception

The AllMusic review by Scott Yanow states: "the basic concept behind the session is the kind of populist nod one rarely associates with cool-school jazz. Thing is, The Swing's to TV is great stuff, a cerebral and atmospheric set of ballads performed with sincerity and affection -- Shank and Cooper always make for a compelling tandem, and songs like 'When You Wish Upon a Star' and 'Put Your Dreams Away' are well matched to their respective talents".

Track listing
 "When You Wish Upon a Star" (Leigh Harline, Ned Washington) - 4:21
 "Put Your Dreams Away" (Ruth Lowe, Paul Mann, Stephen Weiss) - 3:09
 "Thanks for the Memory" (Ralph Rainger, Leo Robin) - 4:32
 "Tenderly"  (Walter Gross, Jack Lawrence) - 2:56
 "Danny Boy" (Traditional) - 4:39
 "Dinah" (Harry Akst, Sam M. Lewis, Joe Young) - 3:22
 "As Long As There's Music" (Jule Styne, Sammy Cahn) - 3:46
 "A Romantic Guy, I" (Del Sharbutt) - 3:39
 "Steve Allen Theme" (Steve Allen) - 4:13
 "The Love Nest" (Louis Hirsch, Otto Harbach) - 3:15  
Recorded at Capitol Studios in Hollywood, CA on January 21, 1958 (tracks 1, 2, 4, & 5) and February 18, 1958 (tracks 3 & 6-10)

Personnel
Bud Shank - alto saxophone, flute
Bob Cooper - tenor saxophone, oboe
Claude Williamson - piano 
Don Prell - bass
Chuck Flores - drums
Jack Pepper, Eudice Shapiro, Bob Sushel - violin (tracks 1, 2, 4 & 5)
Milt Thomas - viola (tracks 1, 2, 4 & 5)
Ray Kramer - cello (tracks 1, 2, 4 & 5)

References

1958 albums
Pacific Jazz Records albums
Bud Shank albums
Bob Cooper (musician) albums